Shuman may refer to:

People

Surname

Buddy Shuman (1915–1955), professional auto racer
Frank Shuman (1862–1918), American inventor, engineer and solar energy pioneer
Frederick Gale Shuman (1919–2005), numerical weather prediction pioneer
Harry Shuman (1915–1996), Major League Baseball player
Kerri Shuman, American bridge player
Mort Shuman (1936–1991), American singer, pianist, and songwriter
Michael Shuman, American rock musician, bass guitarist for Queens of the Stone Age
René Shuman, Dutch singer

Given name
Shuman Ghosemajumder, technologist, businessman

Other uses
Shūman, the nickname for Weekly Manga Times, a manga magazine in Japan
Shuman, Hebrew for fat, in particular to denote kosher fat as opposed to cheilev which may not be eaten
Shuman, a possible former name of Dushanbe

See also
Robert Schuman University, Strasbourg, France
Robert Schumann (1810-1856), German composer
Schumann (disambiguation)
Schoeman (surname)
Shumann